WIN Corporation is a private Australian media company, that owns assets including the WIN Television network, Crawford Productions and several local radio stations. The company is based in Wollongong, New South Wales.

History

Founding
The WIN brand began from a sole free-to-air terrestrial television station in Wollongong, WIN-4, owned by Television Wollongong Transmissions (TWT). In 1979, then-owner Rupert Murdoch sold his 76 per cent controlling interest in TWT to Oberon Broadcasters, a private investment group which included Paramount Television programming executive Bruce Gordon. This allowed Murdoch to purchase Sydney station TEN-10. In 1985, TWT was made public on the-then Sydney Stock Exchange as TWT Holdings Limited with Gordon retaining a 70 per cent stake. Gordon privatised the business in 1992 to become WIN Corporation.

Expansion, aggregation and industry consolidation
In the late 1980s, the Federal Government's television equalisation program (known as aggregation) gave Gordon the opportunity to initiate a period of growth by acquiring television stations in regional Queensland, Victoria, and Tasmania. In the late 1990s, WIN acquired their South Australian station and developed a new Western Australian station from scratch. These stations were integrated into what is now known as the WIN Network. The WIN Network covers large areas of regional Australia and has a total audience reach of 4.842 million people.

Through Bruce Gordon's leadership, in the late 1990s and 2000s, WIN built stakes in PBL, Network Ten, and TPG Telecom. TPG Telecom was at the time known as SP Telemedia and owned fellow Nine affiliate NBN Television.

August 2005 saw WIN purchase a controlling 50.1 per cent stake in satellite subscription television carrier SelecTV, however failure in adequately growing the subscriber base along with high debts saw the business placed in voluntary administration in February 2011.

On 21 April 2007, the board of Sunraysia Television endorsed WIN's revised offer of $163 million for Channel Nine Perth
, which went through on 8 June 2007. On 30 May 2007, Southern Cross Broadcasting announced its sale of Channel Nine Adelaide to WIN for $105 million. In June 2013, WIN offloaded the Nine-branded metropolitan Adelaide station to Nine Network's parent Nine Entertainment Co. for $140 million along with an option to purchase the Perth station, which was exercised in September 2013. In October 2015 WIN Corporation purchased a 14 per cent stake in Nine Entertainment Co. from investment fund operator Apollo.

In 2008, WIN invested in a 50 per cent share of the Australian Poker League, buying from its founder Martin Martinez. However this stake was sold in 2012.

On 4 June 2009, signalling their continued interest in digital assets, WIN increased to 18.4 per cent their stake in publicly listed company Quickflix, an Australian provider of online DVD rental and subscription movie and television series downloads. In the following years, WIN's share of the business dwindled down to 3.5 per cent as of 2014 as Quickflix continued to raise capital through issuing new shares. In April 2016, Quickflix entered voluntary administration.

WIN held a long-term interest in a small cinema chain in Tasmania through a joint venture with Village Roadshow until 2013. The joint venture owned four cinemas which were branded as 'Village Cinemas'. This interest was originally acquired by ENT Ltd. in 1988.

Today
In early 2006, WIN Corporation bought a 25% stake in the St. George Illawarra Dragons from the Illawarra Steelers for $6.5 million. In August 2018 WIN Corporation purchased the Illawarra Steelers remaining 25% stake for a "commercially in confidence" sum, taking its stake to 50%.

It was announced on 23 May 2016 that WIN Television had signed an affiliation agreement with Network Ten for a five-year period starting on 1 July 2016. WIN's former affiliation partner, Nine Network, signed with Southern Cross Austereo in April 2016 having secured a 50 per cent revenue share deal.

WIN plays a prominent role in the local Illawarra community through investment in long-term naming rights to the Dragons' Wollongong home ground, WIN Stadium. WIN also holds naming rights to the neighbouring WIN Entertainment Centre, home to basketball's Illawarra Hawks.

In June 2019, WIN closed several newsrooms throughout New South Wales and Queensland, including Orange, Wagga, Albury and Queensland's Hervey Bay.

Assets

Television
 WIN Television
 RTQ Queensland
 NRN Northern New South Wales
  WIN Southern New South Wales
 VTV Victoria
 TVT Tasmania
 AMN/MTN Griffith (includes Seven Griffith, Nine Griffith and 10 Griffith)
 STV Mildura
 SES/RTS South Australia (includes Seven SA, Nine SA amd 10 SA)
 WOW Western Australia
 Mildura Digital Television (50% joint venture with Seven West Media)
 Tasmanian Digital Television (50% joint venture with Southern Cross Austereo)
 West Digital Television (50% joint venture with Seven West Media)
 Nine Entertainment Co. (15.24% stake)

Radio
WIN Corporation owns two FM radio stations in New South Wales:

 i98FM Wollongong/Illawarra (call sign 2WIN, 98.1 MHz)
 C91.3FM Campbelltown (call sign 2MAC, 91.3 MHz)

Other assets
 Crawford Productions
 Digital Distribution Australia
 Broadcast Services Australia (15.6% stake)
 TPG Telecom (1.5% stake)
 St George Illawarra Dragons (50% stake)

See also
 Regional television in Australia
 List of NRL club owners

References

External links 
 WIN Television web site

WIN Television
Television broadcasting companies of Australia
Radio broadcasting companies of Australia
Mass media companies of Australia